Zulfiqar Ahmed may refer to:

Zulfiqar Ahmed (cricketer), former Pakistani Test cricketer
Zulfiqar Ahmed (cricketer, born 1966), Dutch cricketer